USS Savo Island (CVE-78) was the twenty-fourth of fifty s built for the United States Navy during World War II. She was named to memorialize the U.S. casualties of the Battle of Savo Island, which was fought as part of the Guadalcanal campaign. The ship was launched in December 1943, commissioned in February 1944, and served as a frontline carrier throughout the Mariana and Palau Islands campaign and the Philippines campaign. During the Battle of Okinawa, she provided air cover for the replenishment carrier fleet. Postwar, she participated in Operation Magic Carpet, repatriating U.S. servicemen from throughout the Pacific. She was decommissioned in December 1946, when she was mothballed in the Atlantic Reserve Fleet. Ultimately, she was sold for scrapping in February 1960.

Design and description

Savo Island was a Casablanca-class escort carrier, the most numerous type of aircraft carriers ever built, and designed specifically to be mass-produced using prefabricated sections, in order to replace heavy early war losses. She displaced  standard,  with a full load. She was powered with two Skinner Unaflow reciprocating steam engines, which drove two shafts, providing , thus enabling her to make . Her compact size necessitated the installation of an aircraft catapult at her bow, and there were two aircraft elevators to facilitate movement of aircraft between the flight and hangar deck: one each fore and aft.

One /38 caliber dual-purpose gun was mounted on the stern. Anti-aircraft defense was provided by eight Bofors  anti-aircraft guns in single mounts, as well as 12 Oerlikon  cannons, which were mounted around the perimeter of the deck. By the end of the war, Casablanca-class carriers had been modified to carry thirty 20 mm cannons, and the amount of 40 mm guns had been doubled to sixteen, by putting them into twin mounts. These modifications were in response to increasing casualties due to kamikaze attacks. Although Casablanca-class escort carriers were designed to function with a crew of 860 and an embarked squadron of 50 to 56, the exigencies of wartime often necessitated the inflation of the crew count. Casablanca-class escort carriers were designed to carry 27 aircraft, but the hangar deck could accommodate more. During the Mariana and Palau Islands campaign, she carried 16 FM-2 fighters, and 12 TBM-1C torpedo bombers, for a total of 28 aircraft. During the Battle off Samar, she carried 17 FM-2 fighters and 12 TBM-1C torpedo bombers, for a total of 29 aircraft. During the Battle of Mindoro, she carried 24 FM-2 fighters and 9 TBM-1C torpedo bombers, for a total of 33 aircraft. During the Battle of Lingayen Gulf, she carried 19 FM-2 fighters and 12 TBM-1C torpedo bombers, for a total of 31 aircraft. During the Battle of Okinawa, she carried 20 FM-2 fighters and 12 TBM-3 torpedo bombers, for a total of 32 aircraft.

Construction
Her construction was awarded to Kaiser Shipbuilding Company, Vancouver, Washington under a Maritime Commission contract, on 18 June 1942. The escort carrier was laid down on 27 September 1943 under the name Kaita Bay, as part of a tradition which named escort carriers after bays or sounds in Alaska. She was laid down as MC hull 1115, the twenty-fourth of a series of fifty Casablanca-class escort carriers. She was renamed Savo Island on 6 November 1943, as part of a new naval policy which named subsequent Casablanca-class carriers after naval or land engagements. She was launched on 22 December 1943; sponsored by Miss Margaret Taffinder; transferred to the United States Navy and commissioned on 3 February 1944, with Captain Clarence Eugene Ekstrom in command.

Service history
Upon being commissioned, Savo Island underwent a shakedown cruise down the West Coast to San Diego, where she took on a load of replacement aircraft. Between 15 March 1944 and 2 July, she underwent two transport missions, ferrying aircraft to bases in the Southwest Pacific. On 6 July, she embarked Composite Squadron (VC) 27, which would be her aircraft contingent throughout the Marianas and Palau Islands campaign and the Philippines campaign of 1944–45. After a brief period of training off the waters of San Diego, she sailed west to Pearl Harbor, where similar exercises were conducted. There, on 4 August, she was assigned to Task Group 32.7, the Western Escort Carrier Group, commanded by Rear Admiral William Sample, of the Third Fleet, assigned to support the planned landings on the island of Peleliu, in the Palau Islands. Her aircraft contingent began combat operations on 11 September, strafing and bombarding the island to soften up the defenses for the landings. Following the landing of marines, her aircraft transitioned into providing close air support and patrol missions, up until 30 September.

On 3 October, she was assigned to and joined Task Group 77.4, which was gathering at Manus Island, in the Admiralty Islands, as part of the Seventh Fleet.  She, accompanied by eighteen other escort carriers and their screens of battleships, cruisers, and destroyers, steamed on 12 October for Leyte Gulf, where they were expected to support the landings on Leyte, which marked the beginning of the Philippines campaign. As a part of Task Unit 77.4.2, otherwise known as "Taffy 2", commanded by Rear Admiral Felix Stump, she was positioned to the direct south of "Taffy 3", which was located to the direct east of the San Bernardino Strait. Arriving off the island on 18 October, her aircraft began carrying out naval patrols and strikes against predesignated targets. Once the Sixth Army had landed on 20 October, her aircraft transitioned towards a focus on close air support, supporting the initial advances for the next few days.

On 23 October, the Battle of Leyte Gulf began. Almost the entirety of Japan's remaining surface fleet had been concentrated into a counterattack against the U.S. forces in the vicinity of the Philippines, which had threatened to cut off Japan's vital oil supply from Southeast Asia. Split into three groups, the Southern Force was defeated in the Battle of Surigao Strait, whilst Vice Admiral William Halsey Jr. sent the Third Fleet in an attack against the diversionary Northern Force. Therefore, the escort carriers which continued providing ground support had no capital ship screening, even as Vice Admiral Takeo Kurita's Center Force drove through the San Bernardino Strait during the night.

As the American command came to an understanding of the severity of the situation, with the Center Force consisting of four battleships, six cruisers, and a large destroyer screen, the entirety of Taffy 2's aircraft were recalled to join the defense. Savo Islands fighters and torpedo bombers were not equipped to attack surface ships, with most of her bombers being loaded with incendiary bombs and missiles for ground attacks. Nonetheless, aircraft from Savo Islands VC-27 were amongst Taffy 2's first wave of strikes, launched at 7:37 in the morning. Some of the destroyers within Taffy 2's screen wandered north, before being confronted with some Japanese naval gunfire and being ordered to withdraw towards the escort carriers. Overall, Savo Island launched six strikes against the Japanese forces, with her aircraft notably landing a torpedo hit on a Japanese battleship and shooting down an Aichi E13A reconnaissance seaplane caught in the middle of the action.

Discouraged by the stiff resistance his Center Force had faced, including the loss of three cruisers, Kurita issued orders to withdraw in the late morning, sparing Taffy 3 from further destruction. As the Japanese forces withdrew, fighters from Savo Island took the opportunity to down four more Japanese planes. Nonetheless, the escort carriers underwent concentrated Japanese attack again in the afternoon, this time from the air, including some of the first usage of kamikaze suicide attacks. The carrier continued supporting ground operations until 30 October, when Taffy 2 was reorganized into Task Unit 77.4.4, and ordered to withdraw back to Manus Island to rearm and replenish. She sortied from Manus on 19 November, providing cover for convoys proceeding to Leyte Gulf from 22 November to 27 November, accompanied by two other escort carriers. Upon completing this task, she replenished at Kossol Roads, Palau, before she left on 10 December, this time in support of the landings on the island of Mindoro. Her aircraft provided air cover as the landing craft unloaded their troops, and provided close air support as they advanced. They also targeted air fields, from which kamikaze aircraft were beginning to make regular forays. The escort carriers were relieved by Army aircraft on 15 December, but she stayed offshore until 17 December because of indications of a Japanese surface raid, which never materialized. On 17 December, she steamed back to Manus Island.

At Manus Island, Savo Island was assigned to Task Unit 77.4.2., the San Fabian Carrier Group. On 27 December, the carriers, escorted by a large surface fleet, left Manus bound for Lingayen Gulf, to the west of Luzon. There, the carriers would support the 6th Army landings on Luzon. As a part of Task Unit 77.4.2., Savo Island would provide air support and cover for the I Army Corps, which would land around the San Fabian area. Pausing at San Pedro Bay, the carriers entered the Sulu Sea on 3 January 1945, where they began being harried by aircraft, circling around on radar. Japanese planes continued appearing around the periphery of the American forces throughout 4 January, but it was not until 17:00 in the evening that the Japanese forces coalesced into a kamikaze strike, attacking at 17:12, achieving complete surprise, and sinking Savo Islands sister .

The following day, on 5 January, the kamikazes returned. At 17:43 in the evening, the battleship  reported planes approaching from her starboard bow, and shortly afterwards, Savo Islands sister  had been hit by two kamikazes, heavily damaging the ship. A few minutes after the attack on Manila Bay, a Nakajima Ki-43 kamikaze dove towards Savo Island. As a reaction, Savo Island turned hard to starboard, whilst its  searchlight was pointed at the aircraft to try to blind the pilot. The plane, moving erratically, passed between the carrier's mast and the whip antenna, shearing off the carrier's radar antenna, before diving into the sea.

On 6 January, the carriers proceeded into Lingayen Gulf, and started a heavy bombardment of Japanese defenses, flying 5,971 sorties in eleven days. On 9 January, the 6th Army moved onshore, encountering little resistance. Savo Island remained on station until 17 January, when the United States Air Force took over air operations on Luzon.  She then proceeded south to operate to the northwest of Mindoro, to guard against any counterattacks on the American garrisons situated throughout the Northern Philippines, staying on station from 17 January until 29 January. During this period, on 19 January, Captain William Donald Anderson took command of the ship. Upon completing her patrols, she then provided cover for landings near Subic Bay on 29 and 30 January, before retiring to Ulithi, in the Caroline Islands, for repairs and replenishment. There, her aircraft contingent, Composite Squadron 27, was replaced with Composite Squadron 91, which had previously served upon Savo Islands sister . Upon receiving replacement pilots, she began a brief period of training exercises, before being assigned to Task Unit 52.1.1, in preparation for the Battle of Okinawa.

Transiting via Leyte, her aircraft provided air cover and patrols en route. On 26 March, along with two other escort carriers, she supported the 77th Infantry Division as it occupied the Kerama Islands. On 27 March, she began bombing the main island of Okinawa, with her fighters flying antiaircraft and antisubmarine patrols. Therefore, from 7 to 16 April, she screened a replenishment convoy proceeding to the east of Okinawa. Upon the completion of that task, she continued providing close air support for American forces advancing down Okinawa. On 27 April, her aircraft bombed Sakishima Gunto, an island situated halfway between Okinawa and Formosa. Savo Islands aircraft contingent, Composite Squadron 91, was traded for her sister 's Composite Squadron (VC) 84.

After finishing overhaul, Savo Island began a transport mission from San Diego to Pearl Harbor, before transiting back to Alameda, California, on the West Coast. On 6 August, she departed for the Aleutian Islands, arriving on 15 August, right as the Surrender of Japan was announced. On 31 August, she headed, along with six other escort carriers, to support the occupation of Japan in northern Honshū and Hokkaidō. After finishing her duties, she returned to Pearl Harbor on 25 September, where she was assigned to the "Magic Carpet" fleet, which repatriated servicemen from throughout the Pacific. She first loaded occupation troops bound for Japan at San Francisco, before heading west. Savo Island made a total of three "Magic Carpet" voyages, repatriating troops from Guam, Pearl Harbor, and Okinawa, respectively. Upon arriving at Seattle on 14 January 1946, and finishing her final voyage, she transited to the Eastern seaboard, entering Boston Harbor on 16 March for inactivation.

Savo Island was decommissioned on 12 December, and mothballed in the Atlantic Reserve Fleet, as part of its Boston group. Docked at the South Boston Naval Annex, she was reclassified as a helicopter escort carrier (CVHE-78) on 12 June 1955. She was then further reclassified as an aviation transport (AKV-28) on 7 May 1959. She was struck from the Navy list on 1 September 1959, and she was sold on 29 February 1960 to Comarket Inc., which broke her up in Hong Kong throughout June 1960. Savo Island received 4 battle stars for her World War II service. In addition, she received a Presidential Unit Citation for her service in the Western Carolines, the Philippines, and Okinawa from 6 September 1944 to 29 April 1945. 
Clarence Ekstrom, the carrier's commander during the Battle of Leyte Gulf, later received the Navy Cross for his leadership and courage in the action.

In popular culture
While the Savo Island spent the Korean War in mothballs as part of the Atlantic Reserve Fleet, author James Michener fictionally had it in commission (as an Essex-class fleet carrier) and participating in that war as the primary setting for his novella The Bridges at Toko-ri.

References

Sources

Online sources

Bibliography

External links 

 

 

Casablanca-class escort carriers
World War II escort aircraft carriers of the United States
Ships built in Vancouver, Washington
1943 ships
S4-S2-BB3 ships